Modern Man is the fifth album by jazz fusion bassist Stanley Clarke. "Dayride" from the Return to Forever album No Mystery (1975) was re-recorded for this album. Also included was "More Hot Fun", a sequel to "Hot Fun" from the previous album School Days.

Track listing
All tracks composed by Stanley Clarke, except where noted.

Side one
 "Opening (Statement)" – 4:22
 "He Lives On (Story About the Last Journey of a Warrior)" – 4:24
 "More Hot Fun" – 4:31
 "Slow Dance" – 3:16
 "Interlude: A Serious Occasion" – 0:21
 "Got to Find My Own Place" (Clarke, Michael Garson, Raymond Gomez, Gerry Brown) – 3:17
Side two
 "Dayride" – 4:06
 "Interlude: It's What She Didn't Say" – 1:24
 "Modern Man" – 3:31
 "Interlude: A Relaxed Occasion" – 1:24
 "Rock 'n Roll Jelly" – 5:07
 "Closing (Statement)" – 2:37

Personnel
 Stanley Clarke – double bass, bass guitar, piccolo bass, piano, guitar, vocals
 Mike Garson  –  keyboards
 Jeff Beck  – guitar on "Rock 'n Roll Jelly"
 Raymond Gomez  – guitar
 Jeff Porcaro  – drums
 Gerry Brown  – drums, percussion
 Steve Gadd - cymbal

Production
 Stanley Clarke  – producer, arranger
 Ed Thacker  – engineer
 Art Bechtel, Brian Leshon, Christopher Gregg, Gary J. Coppola, Michael Frondelli, Paul Aronoff – assistant engineer
 Norman Seeff – photography
 Ed Lee – cover design

References

1978 albums
Stanley Clarke albums
Epic Records albums
Jazz-funk albums
Albums recorded at Electric Lady Studios
Albums produced by Stanley Clarke